Muhammad Kāmil ibn Wahba al-Shāfi'ī al-Muqaddasī al-Budayrī was a famous Arab figure in the early 20th century. He was born in Jerusalem in 1882 and assassinated in 1923 in Wadi Rum in Mandatory Palestine and the Emirate of Transjordan.

During the Ottoman rule of Palestine he was appointed as a district commissioner of Ramla.

He was arrested by the British Mandate government upon coming back from a trip to Egypt after he was tipped by the Austrian Jewish agent Sarah Herinson as affiliated with the Arab Resistance at the time before releasing him a few months later.  

As the years 1918 to 1922 witnessed the rising of the Arab National Movement in Jerusalem, Jaffa, Haifa, Akka and Nablus, Kamil joined Amin al-Husseini, his brother Fakhri al-Husseini, Ishaaq Darweesh, Ibrahim Darweesh, Jamal al-Husayni, Aref al-Aref, and Sheikh Hassan Abu Al-So’oud in establishing the Arab Club.  In October 1921, Kamel founded the Al Sabah newspaper on behalf of the Palestine Arab Congress. He was succeeded as editor-in-chief by Yousef Yassin and later Hani Abu Musleh. Al Sabah was the media front of the Arab Palestinian conference and succeeded the newspaper Suriyya al-Janubiyya.

Al Sabah (Arabic, "Morning") was published until 1923, when Kamel Budeiri left Jerusalem and crossed to Transjordan to meet the Saudi princes of Najd and update them on the latest developments in Jerusalem and unify positions on rejecting the Balfour Declaration and the Zionist intentions of establishing a Jewish state in Palestine. He carried on him pictures of the Aqsa Mosque and the Dome of the Rock with the Star of David placed on its then bronze dome. He took a Bedouin guide from the Howeitat tribe to escort him through the Jordanian deserts to Najd, where he was assassinated in what seems to be part of the tribal conflict between the Hashemites and the Saudis during the Arab Revolt.

Notes

1882 births
1923 deaths
Arabs in Ottoman Palestine
People from Jerusalem
Assassinated Palestinian politicians